Creep on Creepin' On is the fourth studio album by Timber Timbre, released on April 5, 2011, on Arts & Crafts. The album was recorded in a variety of locations, including a converted church.

The album was supported by a variety of concert dates in Ontario, Quebec and New York. It debuted at #21 on the Canadian Albums Chart, and was a shortlisted nominee for the 2011 Polaris Music Prize.

Kirk described the album as "...a certain effort to be obscure and dark and scary and kind of menacing ... and it was almost to the point of kitsch, but not... there was an awareness and irony about it, almost to the point of it being a Halloween doo-wop mix tape or something — Monster Mash kind of shit."

Track listing
All music composed and arranged by Timber Timbre.

Personnel
 Taylor Kirk – vocals, drums, percussion, electric guitar, baritone guitar, piano, cover photo
 Simon Trottier – electric guitar, baritone guitar, lap steel guitar, autoharp, percussion, vocals
 Mika Posen – violin, vocals
 Mathieu Charbonneau – piano, harpsichord, organ
 Colin Stetson – C-melody saxophone, tenor saxophone, baritone saxophone, bass saxophone, bass clarinet
 Katherine Peacock – accordion
 Mark Lawson – recording, mixing
 Kees Dekker – recording
 Harris Newman – mastering
 Nina Nielsen – sleeve photo
 Robyn Kotyk – layout

References

2011 albums
Timber Timbre albums
Arts & Crafts Productions albums